Aiyo Maru was a 2,746-ton Type 1C Standard cargo ship/transport ship that was requisitioned from her owners 24 December, 1942. by the Imperial Japanese Army during World War II.

Other than being in a convoy 16-17 May, 1942 From Tokyo Bay to Yokosuka, and another convoy, West Convoy No. 61, that departed Tokyo Bay 8 December, 1942 bound for the Inland Sea, her record of movement are unknown until "Operation 81" begins.

She left Rabaul, New Britain on 1 March 1943, as part of Operation 81, carrying troops, a cargo of equipment, fuel, 5 Daihatsu landing craft and ammunition for Lae, New Guinea. The convoy was attacked by aircraft of the United States Army Air Forces and Royal Australian Air Force from 2 March 1943, known as the Battle of the Bismarck Sea. Aiyo Maru was bombed on 3 March and sank at 07°15'S., 148°30'E. 45 crewmen and 278 soldiers were killed.

Notes

References

1941 ships
Ships built in Japan
Maritime incidents in March 1943
Ships sunk by Australian aircraft
Ships sunk by US aircraft
Shipwrecks in the Bismarck Sea